Máté Sajbán (born 19 December 1995) is a Hungarian professional footballer who plays for Paksi FC.

Career statistics
.

References

1995 births
Living people
Footballers from Budapest
Hungarian footballers
Association football forwards
Mezőkövesdi SE footballers
Budaörsi SC footballers
Paksi FC players
Nemzeti Bajnokság I players
Nemzeti Bajnokság II players